The Memory of Azov (or the Azova Egg) is a jewelled Easter egg made under the supervision of the Russian jeweller Peter Carl Fabergé in 1891 for Tsar Alexander III of Russia. It was presented by Alexander III as an Easter gift to his wife, the Tsarina Maria Feodorovna. It is currently held in the Kremlin Armoury Museum in Moscow.

Design 
Carved from a solid piece of heliotrope jasper, also known as bloodstone, the Memory of Azov Egg is decorated in the Louis XV style with a superimposed gold pattern of Rococo scrolls with brilliant diamonds and chased gold flowers. The broad flute gold bezel is set with a drop ruby and two diamonds that complete the clasp. The egg's interior is lined with green velvet.

Surprise 
The surprise contained within is a miniature replica of the Imperial Russian Navy cruiser Pamiat Azova (Memory of Azov), executed in red and yellow gold and platinum with small diamonds for windows, set on a piece of aquamarine representing the water. The name "Azov" appears on the ship's stern. The plate has a golden frame with a loop enabling the model to be removed from the egg.

History 

The egg commemorates the voyage made by Tsarevitch Nicholas and Grand Duke George of Russia aboard the Pamiat Azova to the Far East in 1890. The trip was made after a suggestion by their parents to broaden the outlook of the future Tsar and his brother. At the time, Grand Duke George was suffering from tuberculosis, and the voyage only exacerbated it. Tsarevitch Nicholas was also the victim of an attempted assassination ("Ōtsu incident") whilst in Japan and sustained a serious head wound. Although the Tsarina was presented with the egg before these events occurred, it apparently was never one of her favourite eggs.

See also 
Egg decorating

References

Further reading

External links 

Description at wintraecken.nl

Imperial Fabergé eggs
1891 works
Fabergé in the Moscow Kremlin Museums